Adrian Dalsey (October 14, 1914, Illinois - October 10, 1994, Walnut Creek, California) was a co-founder of shipping company, DHL Express,.

Early life
Dalsey was born in Illinois on October 14, 1914. He attended Wheaton College there, but later dropped out.

DHL
In 1969, he co-founded DHL Express alongside business partners Larry Hillblom and Robert Lynn. Dalsey was the "D" in DHL. He traveled to southeast Asia, Micronesia, Hawaii, Guam, and other various parts of Asia, until he sold his share of DHL in 1980.

Family
He married Marjorie Schutt Dalsey and they had two children together, a boy named Jonathan and daughter Jennifer. He also fathered another son, Harry Dalsey after divorcing his wife Marjorie.

Walnut Creek slaying
His son Harry admitted to killing Guy Broomfield, the then partner of his mother and brother of actress Shirley Ann Field, in 1999, and plea bargained it down to manslaughter.

Death
Adrian Dalsey married Harry's mother Annie, and they were together until he died in 1994, in Walnut Creek, California.

See also
 Shirley Anne Field (sister of Guy Broomfield)

References

1914 births
1994 deaths
DHL
20th-century American businesspeople